Vera Lúcia Setta (Rio de Janeiro, October 1, 1950) is a Brazilian actress and theatrical producer.

She is the sister of actor Ivan Setta and the mother of actress Morena Baccarin.

Filmography

Cinema 
 Ipanema Toda Nua (1971)
 Luz, Cama, Ação! (1976)
 Simbad, O Marujo Trapalhão (1976)
 O Vampiro de Copacabana (1976) 
 O Trapalhão nas Minas do Rei Salomão (1977) ... Bruxa
 Pequenas Taras (1978)
 Se Segura, Malandro! (1978) .... Marlene 
 A Noiva da Cidade (1978)
 O Mágico e o Delegado (1983)

Theatre 

At some point before March 18, 2010, Vera participated in productions of The Vagina Monologues, directed by Miguel Falabella and working with Mara Manzan and Fafy Siqueira in one season, and Totia Meireles and Cissa Guimarães in another season.

References

External links
 

1950 births
Living people
Actresses from Rio de Janeiro (city)
Brazilian film actresses
Brazilian stage actresses